Riksmålsforbundet (official translation: "The Riksmaal Society - The Society for the Preservation of Traditional Standard Norwegian") is the main organisation for Riksmål, an unofficial variety of the Norwegian language, based on the official Bokmål standard as it was before 1938 (see Norwegian language conflict).

The society was founded by subsequent Nobel laureate Bjørnstjerne Bjørnson on April 7, 1907.

History 
Although Riksmålsforbundet was founded in 1907 by poet Bjørnstjerne Bjørnson, efforts to organize in support of riksmål date back to 1899. It served as opposition to efforts by Norwegians who were organized to promote landsmål as the single language for the country. 

Riksmålsforbundet works to preserve and promote riksmål, a conservative form of written Norwegian, based on the Danish-Norwegian written language tradition. It consistently opposed the government samnorsk (roughly translated "collective Norwegian" or "together Norwegian"; the sam- prefix is related to English same) policy, a now-abandoned project to merge the two main standards of Norwegian (Bokmål and Nynorsk) into one standard that would be used everywhere. 

Prominent members of the riksmål movement included the author Jens Bjørneboe, his cousin André Bjerke, Terje Stigen, Carl Keilhau, Agnar Mykle, Arnulf Øverland, Sigurd Hoel, Johan Bernhard Hjort, Knut Wigert, Margrete Aamot Øverland, Sofie Helene Wigert and Varg Vikernes. Among other spokespersons for the riksmål cause are authors such as Claes Gill, Nils Kjær, Knut Hamsun, Gabriel Scott and Henrik Ibsen. 

In recent years a series of language reforms, particularly those of 1981 and 2005, have shown that many of the Riksmålsforbundet goals have been achieved. The Samnorsk policy has been officially abandoned. Although not necessarily used by most people, most Riksmål spellings are now considered correct in Bokmål too, after being banned from schools and the government for several decades as a consequence of the Samnorsk policy. The reform of 2005 was not purely a partial reversal of previous reforms; some new spellings were introduced or excluded too, based on actual use. In addition, there is now a political majority in favor of discontinuing mandatory speech policy in Norway.

Riksmålsforbundet publishes the magazine Ordet (“The Word”).

Leaders
 1907–1910 Bjørnstjerne Bjørnson
 1910–1911 Ragna Nielsen
 1911–1916 Alfred Eriksen
 1916–1918 I. M. Platou
 1918–1919 Jens Jørgen Mørland
 1919–1929 Gerhard Holm
 1929–1936 Ragnar Ullmann
 1936–1937 Alf Harbitz
 1939–1945 Harald Bakke
 1945–1947 Jonas Hestnes
 1947–1956 Arnulf Øverland
 1956–1959 Sigurd Hoel
 1959–1961 Ernst Sørensen
 1961–1969 Johan Bernhard Hjort
 1969–1974 Aksel Lydersen
 1974–1983 Knut Wigert
 1983–1988 Jan Willoch
 1988–1990 Erling Granholt
 1990– Trond Vernegg

External links 
 Riksmålsforbundet website

References 

Language organisations of Norway